was the lead ship in the  of high speed protected cruisers in the Imperial Japanese Navy. Officially rated as a tsūhōkan, meaning dispatch boat or aviso, Yodo was named after the Yodo River outside Osaka, Japan. Yodo had a clipper bow and two smokestacks, whereas Mogami had a straight raked bow with three smokestacks.

Background
Designed and built domestically in Japan, the lightly armed and lightly armored Yodo-class vessels were intended for scouting, high speed reconnaissance, and to serve as dispatch vessels. However, they were already obsolete when designed, with the development of wireless communication used during the Russo-Japanese War of 1904–1905. Yodo was the first warship to be built by Kawasaki Heavy Industries at its Kawasaki Shipyard in Kobe.

Service life
 
Completed after the end of the Russo-Japanese War, Yodo was used initially for training and coastal patrol duties.

In November 1911, Yodo was dispatched to Bangkok, Siam as part of the Japanese naval delegation attending the coronation ceremonies for King Rama VI of Thailand.

Yodo was re-classified as a 1st class gunboat on 12 October 1912. In World War I, she was assigned to the Japanese 2nd fleet, and although present at the Battle of Tsingtao, did not see any combat. She was subsequently assigned to patrols of former German Micronesia, which has been occupied by Japan during the early stages of the war.

After World War I, Yodo was used as a surveying ship and made various survey trips along the China coast, along with being assigned various miscellaneous auxiliary duties, from its home port at Kure Naval District. With the growing conflict in China following in 1931 Manchurian Incident, Yodo  was assigned primarily to patrols of the north China coastline in the 1930s, with her patrol area extending to the central China coastline after the start of the Second Sino-Japanese War in 1937.

Yodo was demilitarized on 1 April 1940 and renamed Hulk #13. It remained moored to a pier at Iwakuni throughout World War II, and was towed to Hikari, where she was broken up for scrap in 1945.

Notes

References
 
 
 
 
 
 
 

Yodo-class cruisers
1907 ships
Ships built by Kawasaki Heavy Industries
World War I cruisers of Japan
Second Sino-Japanese War cruisers of Japan